Microsoft Office 2000 (version 9.0) is a release of Microsoft Office, an office suite developed and distributed by Microsoft for the Windows family of operating systems. Office 2000 was released to manufacturing on March 29, 1999, and was made available to retail on June 7, 1999. It is the successor to Office 97 and the predecessor to Office XP. A Mac OS equivalent, Microsoft Office 2001, was released on October 11, 2000.

Office 2000 is incompatible with Windows NT 3.51 and earlier versions of Windows. Office 2000 requires Windows 95 or Windows NT 4.0 SP3 at the minimum. It is not officially supported  on Windows Vista or later versions of Windows. It is the last version of Microsoft Office to support Windows 95 and Windows NT 4.0 service packs 3–5; as the following version, Microsoft Office XP only supports Windows NT 4.0 SP6 or later.

Microsoft released three service packs for Office 2000 throughout its life cycle. The first update was called Service Release 1 (SR-1), while subsequent updates were referred to as service packs. Mainstream support for Office 2000 ended on June 30, 2004, and extended support ended on July 14, 2009.

New features 
New features in Office 2000 include HTML document creation and publishing, Internet collaboration features such as integration with NetMeeting, roaming user profile support, COM add-in support; an updated version of the Office Assistant that utilizes Microsoft Agent, improved compliance with the year 2000, and interface improvements including personalized menus and toolbars that omit infrequently used commands from view. Office 2000 introduces PhotoDraw, a raster and vector imaging program, as well as Web Components. It is also the first version of Office to use Windows Installer for the installation process. It also comes with Internet Explorer 5 and uses its technologies as well.

Editions
Microsoft released five main editions of Office 2000 globally: Standard, Small Business, Professional, Premium, and Developer. An additional Personal edition with Word, Excel, and Outlook exclusive to Japan was also released. A similar Basic edition for Office 2003 would later be released to all markets. 

All retail editions sold in Australia, Brazil, China, France, and New Zealand, as well as academic copies sold in Canada and the United States, required the user to activate the product via the Internet. Microsoft extended this requirement to retail editions sold in Canada and the United States with the availability of Office 2000 Service Release 1.  However, product activation is no longer required as of April 15, 2003. Product activation would become a requirement for all editions of Office from Office XP onward.

MapPoint, Project, Visio and Vizact also used the Microsoft Office 2000 brand, but they were only available as standalone programs.

System requirements

Notes

References

1999 software
2000
Office 2000
Windows-only software
Products and services discontinued in 2009